The 1955–56 DFB-Pokal was the 13th season of the annual German football cup competition. It began on 29 April 1956 and ended on 5 August 1956. Five teams, one from each regional federation, competed in the tournament during three rounds. In the final Karlsruher SC defeated Hamburger SV 3–2, thereby defending their title from the preceding season.

Matches

Qualification round

Semi-finals

Final

References

External links
 Official site of the DFB 
 Kicker.de 
 1956 results at Fussballdaten.de 

1955-56
1955–56 in German football cups